The School of Management Fribourg (French: Haute école de gestion Fribourg; German: Hochschule für Wirtschaft Freiburg) is a public higher education institution that was created in 1991 as the School of Economics and Administration (ESCEA) and is attached to the University of Applied Sciences Western Switzerland (HES-SO).

It offers full and/or part-time courses, leading to Bachelor, Master or further postgraduate qualifications and is structured along three departments: the Institute of Entrepreneurship and SME, the Institute of Finance, and the Institute of Social and Public Innovation. The school is located on the Pérolles campus in Fribourg, Switzerland.

The School of Management Fribourg is involved in various national and international research projects, such as the Global Entrepreneurship Monitor, and offers a range of services to businesses, public institutions and professional associations on a national and international level. Faculty members of the school regularly present their research at worldwide renowned scientific conferences, such as the annual meetings of the Academy of Management and the Academy of International Business as well as in scientific journals and textbooks.

The school adopts a trilingual approach (French, German and English) to education as well as research and keeps close ties to partner universities around the globe, such as Swinburne University of Technology, Worcester Polytechnic Institute (WPI), University of Lorraine, University of Montpellier, Grenoble School of Management, EGADE Business School Monterrey, Montreal University, University of Quebec, University of Vermont, and the University of Trier among others.

Spanning the activities of its Institute of Finance as well as the Institute of Entrepreneurship and SME, the school is engaged in research as well as education and consulting activities in the field of Fintech jointly with the Fintech Circle from London.

The School of Management Fribourg offers the following study courses on bachelor and master level:
 Bachelor of Science HES-SO in Business Administration
 Master of Science HES-SO in Business Administration, Major in Entrepreneurship (Innovation and Growth)
 Executive Master in Business Administration HES-SO (MBA)

It furthermore offers study courses leading to a Certificate of Advanced Study (CAS) on the following subjects
 CAS – Business Management
 CAS – Project Management
 CAS – Supply Chain 
 CAS – Corporate Communication 
 CAS – Public Management
 CAS - Management of Social Economy Enterprises 
 CAS - Management of Sustainable Development

References 

Schools in Switzerland